The BDŽ class 75 is a series of Bulgarian narrow-gauge diesel-hydraulic locomotives.

The first 760 mm track-side diesel locomotives of the BDŽ were built by the German company Henschel & Sohn of Kassel, and were put into operation in Bulgaria in the beginning of 1966. As soon as they arrived, they became the main narrow-gauge locomotive series at the Septemvri depot, took the passenger (from the series 81 and 82) and the freight (from the 600.76 series locomotives) service on the railway lines Septemvri - Dobrinishte and  - Pazardzhik. Moreover, due to the higher power of the locomotives, the trip from Septemvri to Dobrinishte was shortened by more than 1 hour.

The locomotives were constructed under the technical conditions of BDŽ and consisted mainly of: a diesel engine with a power of 1100 hp, a hydraulic gear and the wheelset formula is B'B'. At their creation (the 1960s), they were the world's most powerful diesel locomotives for the 760 mm gauge. For the first time in Bulgaria the concept of using the cavities in the main locomotive frame for fuel tank was applied.

The first scrapped locomotive in the series was 75 007.5, which derailed on January 16, 1991, due to a broken track on the open line to the closed stop "Dryanov Dol". The damage to the locomotive was not so great to force it to be scrapped, but due to the sufficient number of locomotives it was not required to be recovered quickly. Thus it became a "donor" for spare parts for the other locomotives of the series and eventually in 1994 it was scrapped.

Factory Data & Current Status

References 

760 mm gauge locomotives
Narrow gauge locomotives of Bulgaria
B-B locomotives
Henschel locomotives
Railway locomotives introduced in 1965